Allium feinbergii is a species of onions found on Mount Hermon, near where the three nations of Israel, Syria, and Lebanon meet. It is a bulb-forming perennial producing an umbel of flowers. Flowers are reddish-purple, narrowly urn-shaped, on long peduncles so that most of them are drooping.

References

feinbergii
Onions
Plants described in 1940